The Wittlich Depression  ( or Wittlicher Rotliegend-Senke), less commonly, the Wittlich Basin, is the continuation of the Trier Valley in a northeasterly direction. It is not only recognisable in the terrain as an elongated depression, but also from its geological structure as a basin.
From a natural region perspective, the Wittlich Depression (252) is one of three major units of the Moselle Valley major unit group Moseltal (25).
The Wittlich Depression Cycleway (Radweg Wittlicher Senke) runs through the region.

Geography 
The Wittlich Depression runs for about 45 kilometres from Schweich in the southwest almost to the River Moselle northeast of Wittlich. At its widest point it is about 7 kilometres across. The depression is bounded to the northwest by the Meulenwald forest, to the southeast by the Moselle Hills and to the east by the Kondelwald.

The Wittlich Depression is drained by the Lieser and its tributaries. The jointed rocks below the surface hold a larger amount of groundwater than the area around the depression. The climate is similar to the mild conditions of the Moselle Valley. Due to its sheltered location, tobacco is grown in the valley.

Natural regions 
The Wittlich Depression is divided into the following natural regions:
 (to 25 - Moselle Valley)
 251 Wittlich Depression 
 251.0 Southwestern Wittlich Depression
 251.00 Föhren Kuppen Land (between Schweich, Föhren und Bekond)
 251.01 Hetzerath Plateau (around Hetzerath)
 251.1 Central Wittlich Depression
 251.10 Sehlem Salm Valley (Salm from Rivenich to Salmtal)
 251.11 Dreis Valley (between Dreis and Wittlich)
 251.12 Wittlich Valley (Wittlich and the regions west-northwest and south-southwest:Lieser from Wittlich to Platten; northeast to Bausendorf)
 251.2 Klausen Hill Country (from Klausen to south of Wittlich)
 251.3 Bausendorf Alf Valley (Alf valley from Bausendorf to below Bengel)

References

Literature 
 
 
 Landesamt für Geologie und Bergbau Rhineland-Palatinate (Hrsg.): Geologie von Rhineland-Palatinate. E. Schweizerbart'sche Verlagsbuchhandlung, Stuttgart, 2005, .

External links 
 Naturräumliche Gegebenheiten. Flächennutzungsplan Wittlich, Erläuterungsbericht
 Böden der Wittlicher Senke. Universität Trier
 BfN-Landschaftssteckbrief

Landscapes of Rhineland-Palatinate
Regions of the Eifel
Natural regions of the Central Uplands